Yueshan Town is an urban town in Xiangxiang City, Hunan Province, People's Republic of China.

Cityscape
The town is divided into 58 villages and two communities, the following areas: 
 
  Baishushan Community
  Tanshushan Community
  Litouqiao Village
  Baozhong Village
  Qianjin Village
  Shengli Village
  Sanwan Village
  Anchong Village
  Baolong Village
  Baoping Village
  Baolu Village
  Bailong Village
  Xilin Village
  Zixalin Village  Jinping Village
  Jinshan Village
  Shanfeng Village
  Malong Village
  Tianxin Village
  Nanyue Village
  Longchong Village
  Pengshan Village
  Lingyang Village
  Shuanglong Village
  Hechong Village
  Dongzhu Village
  Zizhu Village
  Lizi Village
  Hongri Village
  Yingshi Village
  Dongkou Village
  Siqian Village
  Yueshan Village
  Baifeng Village
  Baihe Village
  Hongguang Village
  Taishan Village
  Fengshan Village
  Hongmei Village
  Fengyu Village
  Yunnan Village
  Shiqiaoshi Village
  Shifo Village
  Qingping Village
  Huangtukan Village
  Hengjiang Village
  Xinqiao Village
  Hongyang Village
  Jiangdong Village
  Jiangtian Village
  Qunle Village
  Shuikou Village
  Nanmu Village
  Shixi Village
  Yuntian Village
  Shizhu Village
  Dongfeng Village
  Jianlouping Village
  Shitoupu Village
  Dongkouba Village
  Shiji Village

References

External links

Divisions of Xiangxiang